Maurice Vanderschueren, better known as Maurice Vander (born 11 June 1929, Vitry-sur-Seine, died 16 February 2017, Montmorillon ) was a French jazz keyboardist.

Vander worked in the 1950s with Don Byas, Django Reinhardt, Bobby Jaspar, Jimmy Raney, Stephane Grappelli, Chet Baker, and Kenny Clarke. He won the Prix Django Reinhardt in 1962. In the 1960s he was a session musician for Roger Guerin, Pierre Gossez, and Boulou Ferré, and played with Claude Nougaro and Ivan Jullien. He played with Baker again in the late 1970s and with Johnny Griffin; his later work included performing and recording with Clarke, Richie Cole, Art Farmer, and Benny Powell.

Vander is the adoptive father of Christian Vander (musician).

References

Michel Laplace, "Maurice Vander". The New Grove Dictionary of Jazz. 2nd edition, ed. Barry Kernfeld.

French jazz pianists
French male pianists
French jazz organists
Musicians from Paris
French male organists
20th-century pianists
20th-century organists
20th-century French musicians
20th-century French male musicians
French male jazz musicians
1929 births
2017 deaths